The Department of National Development was an Australian government department that existed between March 1950 and December 1972, and briefly between December 1977 and December 1979.

History
The Department of National Development was established in March 1950, with Richard Casey, Baron Casey as its Minister. Media reported that the new Department would plan for the supply of basic commodities, promote decentralisation and regional development and plan for the development of primary and manufacturing industries and the stimulation of housing construction.

By 1969, the Department consisted of five divisions: the resources policy division; the northern development division; the Bureau of Mineral Resources; the Forestry and Timber Bureau; and the division of national mapping.

The Department was one of six abolished by the Whitlam Government in December 1972. It functions were split between four new departments, namely the Department of Environment and Conservation, the Department of Minerals and Energy and the Department of Northern Development, as well as two established departments—the Department of Works and the Department of Primary Industry.

The department was created for the second time on 20 December 1977 in the Fraser Government before it was abolished two years later in 8 December 1979.

Scope
Information about the department's functions and/or government funding allocation could be found in the Administrative Arrangements Orders, the annual Portfolio Budget Statements and in the Department's annual reports.

At its first creation, the Department was responsible for the following:
Survey of immediate shortages in basic commodities and planning of improvements by increased production or import
Promotion of decentralisation and regional development throughout the Commonwealth and the Territories of the Commonwealth
Surveys of natural resources and development
 Planning the development of national resources generally, and in particular the development of primary and manufacturing industries and the stimulation of housing and building construction
Administration of Commonwealth-State Housing Agreements
Development planning in conjunction with the various States and, where necessary, co-ordination of such development planning, including the investigation of such national works as are referred to the Department by the Government
In conjunction with Treasury and other interested Departments, to make arrangements with the respective States and Other Governmental authorities with regard to the cost and execution of development projects
To control funds required for the approved programme of development  work.

At its second creation in 1979, the Department was responsible for the following:
National energy planning and research 
Minerals exploration and resource assessment 
Water resources and electricity 
Geodesy and mapping 
Decentralisation

Structure
The Department was a Commonwealth Public Service department, staffed by officials who were responsible to the Minister for National Development. In order of appointment, the Department's Ministers were: Richard Casey, Bill Spooner, David Fairbairn, Reginald Swartz and Lance Barnard, and Kevin Newman between 1977 and 1979. The Secretary of the Department was A.J. Woods.

List of national development ministers

References

Ministries established in 1950
National Development